Verkhny Mangirtuy (Deede Mangirta) is a rural locality (a selo) in Bichursky District, Republic of Buryatia, Russia. The population was 418 as of 2010. There are 10 streets.

Geography 
Verkhny Mangirtuy is located 33 km northwest of Bichura (the district's administrative centre) by road. Nizhny Mangirtuy is the nearest rural locality.

References 

Rural localities in Bichursky District